The Magnus Archives is a horror fiction podcast written by Jonathan Sims, directed by Alexander J. Newall, and distributed by Rusty Quill. Sims narrated the podcast in-character as the main character, Jonathan Sims, the newly appointed Head Archivist of the fictional Magnus Institute—an institution based in London centered on research into the paranormal. In 2018, BBC Sounds listed the show as one of the largest British dramatic podcasts, with an extensive fanbase on Tumblr having driven much of its success. , The Magnus Archives had reached a download rate of over 2.5 million downloads a month, growing to over 4 million downloads a month by July 2020.

Production 
The podcast is structured as a series of statements recorded, or written and then recorded, for internal research use within the Magnus Institute. At the beginning of each statement, the statement-taker—typically Jon, the head archivist—provides a brief description of the statement and the name of the statement-maker. Those who give or record statements in the Magnus Institute tend to lapse into a trance-like state, not unlike reliving the event as they narrate it.

Cast and characters

Main cast 
 Jonathan Sims as Jonathan "Jon" Sims, the Head Archivist of the Magnus Institute, a title with which he announces himself at the beginning of each statement he records, eventually shortened to "the Archivist" following the events of episode 120, "Eye Contact". Jon begins the series as often rude, short-tempered, and commonly skeptical of the supernatural subject material of the statements themselves; however, as the seasons progress, Jon accepts the stories relayed by statement-makers as real, and becomes kinder and more sympathetic. As of "Dwelling" and perhaps before, he is in a romantic relationship with Martin Blackwood. He is asexual.
 Alexander J. Newall as Martin Blackwood, an archival assistant at the Magnus Institute, who obtained his job by lying about holding a degree in parapsychology. He is soft-spoken and generally gravitates away from social gatherings. As of "Dwelling" and perhaps before, he is in a romantic relationship with Jonathan Sims.
 Lottie Broomhall as Sasha James, an archival assistant at the Magnus Institute, mainly locating records that could set the standard of proof for statements. In episode 39, "Infestation", she is replaced by an entity known as 'Not-Sasha' (voiced by Evelyn Hewitt), which wears her identity with a different body, a change only obvious to Melanie King, with the rest of the Institute staff oblivious.
 Mike LeBeau as Timothy "Tim" Stoker, an archival assistant at the Magnus Institute, who assumed the role when Jon was promoted to head archivist, having worked with him previously in the research department. He has been in relationships with men and women, as revealed in episode 3, "Across the Street", when he courts two file clerks. Tim begins the series as kind and cocksure, but comes to resent his position within the institute, which he is unable to leave, and becomes increasingly more cynical and angry in his interactions with his co-workers, mainly Jon.
 Ben Meredith as Elias Bouchard/Jonah Magnus, the Head of the Magnus Institute. He is initially dismissive of the concerns surrounding active paranormal activity within the institute, but is quick to reveal some degree of knowledge, and as having intentionally withheld information when confronted.
 Evelyn Hewitt as Not-Sasha, a paranormal entity that wears Sasha James' identity. It lives in the tunnels under the Institute when not performing the administrative tasks previously assigned to the real Sasha James, and has a significant role in drawing Jon's attention to the paranormal happenings within and below the institute. It has known issues with using technology, especially when compared to the original Sasha.
 Sue Sims as Gertrude Robinson, the previous Head Archivist of the Magnus Institute. She was replaced by Jonathan Sims after going missing in March 2015. She appears in some episodes in past recordings of statements, as Jon and the other assistants work to understand her previous role at the institute. Her demeanor is brusque, and she is very serious about her work. The true motive of her work and motives is slowly revealed throughout the series, especially seasons 3 and 4.
 Frank Voss as Basira Hussain, an officer sectioned to work on 'weird' cases. After responding to a police case tied to a supernatural event, she signs a 'Section 31' form, and becomes more and more involved in cases that eventually tie back to The Magnus Institute. She becomes involved in an investigation surrounding a death in the Institute in episode 43, aptly named "Section 31", and is quickly entangled in the institute's mysterious happenings.
 Fay Roberts as Alice "Daisy" Tonner, a detective also sectioned to work on 'weird' cases through Section 31. She is known to use force, as well as her own judgements, to resolve cases. 
 Lydia Nicholas as Melanie King, the former host of the YouTube series Ghost Hunt UK. After some strange supernatural incidents, she comes to be employed by the Magnus Institute. As of "Rotten Core" and perhaps before, she is in a romantic relationship with Georgie Barker.
 Sasha Sienna as Georgie Barker, the fearless host of the What The Ghost? podcast. She lives with her cat, The Admiral, and dated Jonathan Sims back when they both attended University. As of "Rotten Core" and perhaps before, she is in a romantic relationship with Melanie King.
 Alasdair Stuart as Peter Lukas, Captain of the Tundra, avatar of The Lonely, and member of the Lukas Family. He acts as the antagonist, and temporary Institute Head, in Season 4.

Recurring cast 
 Jon Gracey as Gerard "Gerry" Keay, the son of Mary Keay, who worked alongside Gertrude Robinson after she freed him from his mother. He is described as having "poorly dyed" black hair as well as tattoos of eyes on all of his joints and over his heart. Upon his death in 2014, Gertrude Robinson bound him to the Catalogue of the Trapped Dead, where he remained in ghost form until Jonathan Sims burned his page.
 Paul Sims as Jurgen Leitner, a collector of books affected by the same paranormal forces the Institute researches. He went into hiding in 1994 after his library was burned down, and resided in the tunnels underneath of the Institute until his death, via "brutal pipe" murder, in episode 80, "The Librarian".
 Luke Booys as Michael, also known as The Distortion, a manifestation of a paranormal power. Its appearance is flexible, but its base appearance is that of Gertrude Robinson's former assistant, Michael Shelley, a tall man with straw blonde hair and a round face. The Distortion was bound to Michael as part of a ritual disrupted by Gertrude, thereafter took on the appearance of her former assistant, distorting his features and appearing as thin and limp, with hands the size of its torso, an appearance only visible in mirrors. It both resides in and is a realm accessible only by a door of its own conjuring. It preys on people by luring them into its door and trapping them within an inescapable labyrinth. It was killed by and became Helen in episode 101, "Another Twist".
 Hannah Brankin as Jane Prentiss, a previously ordinary woman working as a New Age shop assistant, now turned into a living hive for wasp larvae after finding a wasps nest in her attic. Prentiss infected others by having the worms bury into their flesh, either killing them or turning them into hives. She was killed in the archives and cremated soon after.
 Imogen Harris as Helen Richardson, a manifestation of paranormal power replacing Michael, who occasionally assists and disrupts the Archive's activities. 
 Guy Kelly as Michael Crew, an avatar of a paranormal force who meets Jonathan Sims in episode 91, "The Coming Storm". He has a large, branching scar in the shape of a Lichtenberg figure as the result of being struck by lightning as a child.
 Jessica Law as Nikola Orsinov, a plastic mannequin who was originally Joseph Grimaldi. Orsinov serves a paranormal power which she attempts, and fails, to summon in episode 119, "Stranger and Stranger".
 Hannah Walker as Jude Perry, a member of The Cult of the Lightless Flame, a group dedicated to destruction and suffering, who encounters Jonathan Sims in episode 89, "Twice as Bright".
 Russell Smith as Oliver Banks, an avatar of The End able to see people's life force in the form of black tendrils.

Plot 
The podcast is initially presented as a horror anthology, following the efforts of Jonathan Sims, Head Archivist of the Magnus Institute, to record on tape a number of statements of paranormal events that have proven impossible to record through conventional, digital means. Over the course of five seasons, a more complex metaplot develops, revealing the nature of the Magnus Institute, its head, Elias Bouchard, and the nature of the paranormal events recorded in the statements.

Season 1

Season 1 of the Magnus Archives ran from 24 March 2016 to 13 October 2016.

The eponymous Jonathan Sims is installed as the new Head Archivist of the Magnus Institute's Archives, his predecessor Gertrude Robinson having gone missing and is presumed dead. As he attempts to digitize statements about supernatural incidents, he finds that some statements can only be recorded on a tape recorder, as opposed to the preferred digital recordings. Among these statements are mentions of paranormal books referred to as "Leitners," many of them having originated from a library previously belonging to a man named Jurgen Leitner. The final conflict of the season involves a woman named Jane Prentiss, who has become the host for a mass of parasitic worms that attacks the archival staff. In the chaos of Prentiss' attack, Sasha dies and a supernatural being assumes her identity. During the attack, the body of Gertrude Robinson is found in one of the tunnels beneath the institute.

Season 2 

Season 2 of the Magnus Archives ran from 1 December 2016, to 31 August 2017.

Jon becomes convinced that there is a conspiracy behind the murder of Gertrude Robinson and his paranoia continues to increase as he begins working alongside Constable Basira Hussain and the police to investigate. Jon begins to explore the tunnels beneath the Archives, and discovers evidence of both Sasha and an unknown old man entering the tunnels. Jon is confronted by a supernatural being called Michael, who claims that Sasha is "lying to him." Melanie returns to the institute and insists that the Sasha currently on staff is not the same person she met on previous visits to the institute. Jon discovers that a creature is impersonating Sasha and it chases him through the Institute tunnels until Jon is saved by Jurgen Leitner. Leitner explains that he has been hiding in the tunnels since the destruction of his library in 1994, evading various monsters and people who sought to do him harm. He then explains his understanding of the entities behind the books: that they are manifestations of vast, powerful entities based on primal fears that exist just outside of human perception. He also relates that he believes that the institute's Head, Elias, is the one who killed Gertrude, who Leitner had been working with to destroy the institute, itself a place of power for one of the entities known as The Eye. Later, Elias brutally murders Leitner with a metal pipe and frames Jon, who flees from the scene.

Season 3 

Season 3 of the Magnus Archives ran from 23 November 2017, to 27 September 2018.

Despite being in hiding, Jon finds that statements are continually being mailed to him, and follows their trails to two individuals known as Jude Perry and Michael Crew, who are "avatars" (servants) of fear entities known as "The Desolation" and "The Vast" respectively. Jon discovers that he has the power to compel individuals to answer his questions, so Basira and Daisy decide to take Jon to the institute to use his powers to force Elias to confess to the murders of Gertrude Robinson and Leitner. Jon's powers do not affect Elias, but Elias willingly admits that he murdered Gertrude and Leitner before forcing Basira to sign an employment form for the institute. He then reveals that those employed by the institute are unable to leave without his permission and that if he were to die, anyone employed by him would die as well. In addition, those who attempt to leave the institute or refuse to work there while employed will gradually grow weak and eventually die. Forced to do Elias' bidding, they are tasked with stopping a ritual known as the "Unknowing", wherein manifestations and avatars of the fear entity known as "The Stranger" will attempt to reshape reality to allow the entity to come into existence, which, if successful, would cause the entire world to suffer under eternal torment to feed the entity.

Shortly after beginning to investigate the Unknowing and how to stop it, Jon is threatened by a living mannequin known as Nikola Orsinov, who asks him to give them an ancient taxidermied gorilla skin, which was stolen by Gertrude Robinson several years ago. However, when Jon fails to produce said item, he is kidnapped and held at a secret location, where Nikola reveals that without the gorilla skin, she will need the skin of an Archivist to complete the Unknowing. When Jon is left alone, Michael appears, and reveals his origin: he is a being known as "The Distortion", itself a manifestation of the fear entity known as "The Spiral." The Distortion had been crucial to the success of a ritual similar to the Unknowing that had been undertaken by the Spiral. However, before it could succeed, Gertrude Robinson gave one of her assistants, named Michael Shelley, a map of the Distortion before having him devoured by it. Utilizing the map, Michael Shelley found the core of the Distortion and the two became merged together, which caused the Spiral's ritual to fail. Michael has decided to kill Jon so that the Unknowing can not succeed, but before he can do so, Helen is merged with the Distortion. She then transports him back to the institute.

Jon follows an old itinerary belonging to Gertrude, which takes him to New Zealand, China, and America. While in America, he is approached by two monster hunters named Julia Montauk and Trevor Herbert, who have him use a book that summons the ghost of a man named Gerard Keay, who had traveled with Gertrude before he succumbed to a brain tumor. Gerard then describes the 14 fear entities to Jon: the Eye, the patron entity of the Magnus Institute, and the fear of being watched or having one's secrets exposed; the Spiral, the fear of madness and lies; the End, the fear of death; the Stranger, the fear of the uncanny or things that are not quite human; the Lonely, the fear of being alone; the Desolation, the fear of fire, pain, and destruction; the Slaughter, the fear of violence; the Vast, the fear of the infinite or of being insignificant; the Buried, the fear of being trapped without enough space, whether physical or not; the Dark, the fear of the darkness and what might be in it; the Corruption, the fear of rot, decay, filth; the Web, the fear of spiders and of being manipulated; the Flesh, the fear that one is nothing more than meat; the Hunt, the fear of being hunted. Gerard then directs Jon to a storage unit, where Gertrude had stored an something that could stop the Unknowing.

When he returns to London, Jon finds that the storage unit is filled with plastic explosives. He, Basira, Daisy, and Tim then travel to the location of the Unknowing to stop it. Meanwhile, Martin and Melanie execute a plan to distract Elias and collect evidence of Elias' crimes, which is sufficient to have the police arrest him. However, Nikola begins the Unknowing using the skin of Gertrude Robinson, and its effects cause the group to become incapable of semiosis. Basira is able to escape the ritual, while Daisy is trapped within a coffin-like manifestation of the Buried. Jon uses his powers of compulsion to make Tim immune to the ritual's effect, and Tim detonates the plastic explosives at the ritual site, which stops the Unknowing at the cost of his life, while Jon is left in a coma-like state. Due to his imprisonment, Elias sends a man named Peter Lukas, an avatar of the Lonely, to watch over the Magnus Institute in his stead.

Season 4 

Season 4 of the Magnus Archives ran from 10 January 2019, to 31 October 2019.

Following the Unknowing, Jon remains in a coma for six months. While unconscious, he is visited by an avatar of the End, who encourages him to make a choice between dying or fully accepting his role as an avatar of the Eye. Jon then awakens, and begins to refer to himself simply as "the Archivist", while reading statements has now grown into a physical need for him. Upon returning to the Magnus Institute, Basira explains that four months after the Unknowing was stopped, the institute was attacked by an avatar of the Flesh named Jared Hopworth, whom Melanie had fought off with a knife before he was trapped by Helen.

Shortly afterward, a manifestation of the Stranger delivers the coffin in which Daisy is trapped before he is driven away by Jon. After some preparation, Jon willingly enters the coffin, and returns with Daisy.

Meanwhile, Martin has been working with Peter Lukas, the latter of whom believes that a fifteenth fear entity, known as "the Extinction", is emerging due to the growing fear that humans are destroying the world. Peter and Martin have agreed to work together in an attempt to combat it in some way.

Based on information revealed by Elias, Jon and Basira travel to Ny-Ålesund in order to stop a supposed ritual being performed by a cult of the Dark. They find the cult's headquarters abandoned, save for a single member, whom Jon compels for information. The cultist reveals that in 2015, the cult had attempted a ritual to manifest the Dark, but it had failed despite having seemingly gone unopposed. Jon then stares at the "Dark star", the focal point of the cult's ritual attempt, which destroys it.

After listening to several more statements that confirm that the Extinction is causing supernatural occurrences, Peter Lukas explains to Martin that he will soon have a map of the tunnels beneath the institute, and will therefore soon be able to execute their plan. 

Once Peter acquires his map, he and Martin immediately venture into the tunnels, where Peter releases the creature that had impersonated Sasha ("Not-Sasha") as a distraction. Basira and Daisy then reveal that Elias has escaped from prison, and they find a tape of the moment Elias killed Gertrude Robinson. The tape reveals that Elias is actually Jonah Magnus, the founder of the institute, who has been able to transfer his consciousness to other bodies to extend his life. Martin and Peter then arrive at the Panopticon of Millbank Prison, in which is a chair where Jonah Magnus' eyeless original body rests, at which point Jonah himself also arrives. Peter then encourages Martin to destroy Magnus' original body and take its place, which will enable him to use the Eye's power to learn vital information about the Extinction. However, Martin refuses, and Peter casts him into a manifestation of the Lonely in anger. Meanwhile, Daisy willingly succumbs to the influence of the Hunt to gain the power needed to stop Not-Sasha, as well as Julia Montauk and Trevor Herbert. Jon makes his way to the Panopticon, and enters the Lonely to retrieve Martin. Jon uses his powers to find Peter Lukas within the Lonely, and compels a statement from him. Peter states that his plan with Martin was all part of an attempt to win a bet with "Elias", which he had lost when Martin refused to destroy Jonah Magnus' original body. When Jon compels Peter to tell him what Jonah won from the bet, he refuses, and is ultimately killed when he continually resists Jon's compulsions. Jon then retrieves Martin, and they exit the Lonely. 

As the Magnus Institute is now a crime scene, and Daisy, Julia, Trevor, and Not-Sasha are nowhere to be found, Jon and Martin travel to a wooden cabin in Scotland. Basira sends a box of statements to the cabin for Jon, and Jon begins to read one of them, which turns out to have been written by Jonah Magnus. Jon's powers prevent him from not finishing the statement, and so he is forced to read the rest of it. The statement reveals that Jonah, who had become fearful of being a victim of a successful ritual, sought to complete a ritual to manifest the Eye utilizing Millbank prison, the design of which he had influenced. However, when he attempted the ritual in the 1800's, the ritual failed and destroyed the prison, but gifted him his powers of limited omniscience. He then founded the Magnus Institute to enable him to protect the now underground Millbank prison, as well as plan for the execution of another ritual for the Eye in the future. However, when he had witnessed the brutal efficiency in which Gertrude Robinson had derailed the rituals of the Flesh, the Buried, the Desolation, the Lonely, and the Spiral, he began to wonder why no ritual had ever succeeded. As he could not answer this question, he began to wonder if rituals were unable to succeed due to their focus on only a single fear entity. Gertrude Robinson also suspected this to be the case, and had allowed the ritual of the Dark to go unopposed to test her theory. When the unopposed ritual failed, Jonah understood what he needed to do: devise a ritual that would manifest all 14 entities, a goal he hoped to accomplish before the complete emergence of the Extinction. 

Upon Gertrude's death, Jonah threw his plan into motion, which would require an Archivist that had been exposed to supernatural occurrences from all 14 entities. As a result, he appointed Jon to the role of Archivist due to him having already encountered the Web during his childhood. Jon was then marked by all 13 other entities through his various near-death experiences as an Archivist. Once Jon's journey into the Lonely marked him for the final power, Jonah had sent Jon his statement to complete the ritual.

Jon, unable to stop reading, chants a ritual that brings through all of the entities. When Martin wakes Jon, all he can say is "Look at the sky, it's looking back."

Season 5 
Season 5 of the Magnus Archives ran from 1 April 2020, to 25 March 2021.

The season was split into three acts due to production delays caused by the COVID-19 pandemic.

Due to the ritual unwillingly performed by Jon, the world has now been transformed by the fear entities, and this change is believed to be irreversible. Jon and Martin venture from the cabin and travel towards what used to be London, in which the Magnus Institute and the Panopticon have been merged into a massive tower that can be seen anywhere on Earth.

Due to the change, humans can no longer be killed nor reproduce, and no longer need to eat, drink or sleep. However, the world and its people are now divided among many "Domains", where humans are ruled by avatars and tortured endlessly in a manner that feeds the dominant fear entity within each domain. Due to Jon's power, he and Martin are able to travel through the Domains without being affected by them, though Jon is almost always compelled to make a statement that describes them.

Jon and Martin find Not-Sasha in a Stranger-aligned Domain. When Not-Sasha attempts to intimidate Jon and Martin, Jon calls upon the Eye and uses its power to destroy her.

Upon further discussion, Jon discovers he is almost completely omniscient and is able to know almost anything. While he is able to know where Basira and Daisy are, with the former hunting the latter, who is now an avatar of the Hunt that is also able to travel through Domains and permanently kill humans, he is unable to locate Melanie and Georgie due to Georgie having lost the ability to feel fear and Melanie having blinded herself in the previous season.

Later, they travel through a Domain aligned with the End, which is discovered to permanently kill humans. Due to the fact that humans are no longer born or created, it is believed that End-aligned Domains will eventually render humanity extinct, and with nothing to fear them, the fear entities themselves would also die out.

Jon and Martin then travel through several other Domains, with Jon using the Eye's power to destroy Jude Perry and Jared Hopworth in their Domains along the way. Eventually, the duo arrives at a Domain of the Hunt, one of the victims of which is Trevor Herbert. Trevor reveals that Daisy had killed Julia Montauk when they attacked the institute before he is killed by Basira. Though Basira remains distrustful of Jon, she agrees to accompany him and Martin to stop Daisy. They eventually catch up to Daisy at a Desolation Domain where its victims are forced to burn objects they love. Though Daisy injures Jon and threatens Martin, Basira kills her, and decides to separate from them to deal with the trauma.

Jon and Martin arrive in an area that has seemingly been untouched by the change. Inside, they find a house populated by a former seller of paranormal artifacts named Mikaele Salesa, as well as Annabelle Cane. Mikaele reveals that he is utilizing a paranormal camera to create a small part of the world unaffected by the entities so that he does not suffer. Though Martin is rejuvenated by the return to normalcy, Jon grows weaker and weaker, and so they leave the unaffected area to continue their journey.

After traveling through more Domains, Martin reaches his own Domain, which is aligned to both the Eye and the Lonely and feeds on the fear that one will suffer alone while mourned by no one. Jon, meanwhile, reaches the Distortion, which is itself now a Spiral Domain that takes the form of a constantly-shifting hotel, though it can still traverse said hotel in Helen's form. When Jon realizes that Helen will seek to obstruct their goal to free the world from the entities, he destroys her.

Jon and Martin reach London. They reunite with Georgie and Melanie, who are sheltering a group of people they have rescued from fear Domains who revere them as religious figures. Jon and Martin ascend the Panopticon to confront Jonah and discover he has become "the pupil of the Eye", locked in a trance state where he continuously narrates the experiences of those trapped in fear Domains. Jon states that the Eye wants him to kill Jonah and take his place, and if he does so he can mitigate the horrors of the apocalypse by redirecting the suffering towards those who "deserve it". This leads to an argument with Martin and the two separate. After reflecting, Jon decides to apologize to Martin, but discovers Martin has left with Annabelle for unknown reasons. Jon deduces that the two are going to Hill Top Road and follows, reuniting with Basira along the way.

At Hill Top Road, Annabelle destroys Salesa's camera and reveals that Hill Top Road contains a hole in reality that allows one to enter other universes. The Web, possessing greater intelligence than the other entities, is aware that the End will eventually starve the entities of fear and seeks to avoid this fate by escaping to another universe. The path to the other universes is formed from the spontaneously-generated magnetic tapes the group has encountered throughout the series, which captured Jon's voice to use as a lure for the other entities. Annabelle tells the group that if they simultaneously destroy the Panopticon by detonating a gas main beneath the Magnus Institute and kill the Eye's pupil, the entities will leave and the apocalypse will be reverted. Jon initially rejects the idea of inflicting their apocalypse on another world, but Annabelle claims the entities will only exist "at the fringes" in the new world, like they did before the apocalypse. Annabelle releases Martin and Jon decides to spare her life.

Jon, Martin, and Basira return to Georgie and Melanie, whose followers were captured by monsters and returned to fear Domains. The group discusses their options: Execute Annabelle's plan; allow Jon to become the pupil and accelerate the End's destruction of all life to starve the entities; or do nothing and adapt to the new world. Jon advocates for the second option, but is outvoted by the group, who unilaterally support Annabelle's plan. Jon gives Georgie his lighter so she can destroy the Panopticon, but the Web exerts a supernatural power to make him forget doing so.

Jon secretly confronts and kills Jonah on his own, becoming the new pupil. He gives a statement from the entities themselves, revealing that entering the multiverse was the Web's goal from the start and it manipulated events throughout the series to make this come about. Martin arrives but is too late to stop Jon. Jon, forgetting that he gave his lighter to Georgie, is surprised when Georgie's group successfully destroys the Panopticon. Realizing his plan has failed, he lets Martin cut his tether to the Eye, completing Annabelle's plan. Jon believes this will kill them both, but expresses a faint hope they will survive.

Later, a tape recorder activates to record a conversation between Georgie, Melanie, and Basira. The world has returned to normal, but everyone remembers their experiences in the fear Domains and have killed many of the now-powerless avatars who tormented them. The group searches the ruins of the Panopticon but can find no trace of Jon or Martin. Basira finds the tape recorder and says "If anyone's listening... Goodbye. I'm sorry, and... Good luck," before turning it off, implying that the fear entities have been released into our world.

Sequel 
On October 24, 2022, it was announced that a sequel was in the works and would be funded through Kickstarter. On October 30, 2022, the title was revealed to be The Magnus Protocol.

Reception 
Emily L. Stephens wrote at The A.V. Club that the show has a "vast catalog of horrors and excellent production values." Rachel Weber wrote in GamesRadar that the protagonist's "charmingly grumpy mic presence is a highlight" of the show. Catriona Harvey-Jenner wrote in Cosmopolitan that "you only need to listen to one episode to become hooked." Bryan Bishop wrote in The Verge that the show uses a "minimalist production, [that] lend the stories an eerie, creeping dread." Natalie Zutter wrote at Tor.com that the show is a "welcome distraction from other present terrors." Megan Summers wrote in Screen Rant that the "Magnus Archives is a pioneering horror podcast." Mason Downey wrote in GameSpot that the show is a "perfect blend of spooky, X-Files style monster-of-the-week stories."

The Sydney Morning Herald and Polygon reported that there was a rumor suggesting that the first episode of the final season caused Patreon to crash, but Patreon did not confirm the rumors.

Awards

See also 

 Horror podcast

References

External links 
Official website

Audio podcasts
Horror podcasts
British podcasts
Fictional government investigations of the paranormal
LGBT-related podcasts
2016 podcast debuts
2021 podcast endings
Creative Commons-licensed podcasts
Scripted podcasts